Ernest Victor Gross (19 March 1900 – 18 November 1981) was an Australian rules footballer who played with Geelong in the Victorian Football League (VFL).

Notes

External links 

1900 births
1981 deaths
Australian rules footballers from Victoria (Australia)
Geelong Football Club players
Newtown Football Club players
People educated at Geelong College